Union Amicale Cognac Football is a French association football club founded in 1902. They are based in the town of Cognac and their home stadium is the Stade de la Belle Allée.

External links
  

Association football clubs established in 1902
1902 establishments in France
Football clubs in Nouvelle-Aquitaine
Sport in Charente